An amino acid neurotransmitter is an amino acid which is able to transmit a nerve message across a synapse.  Neurotransmitters (chemicals) are packaged  into vesicles that cluster beneath the axon terminal membrane on the presynaptic side of a synapse in a process called endocytosis.

Amino acid neurotransmitter release (exocytosis) is dependent upon calcium Ca2+ and is a presynaptic response.

Types
Excitatory amino acids (EAA) will activate post-synaptic cells. inhibitory amino acids (IAA) depress the activity of post-synaptic cells.

See also
 Amino acid non-protein functions
 Monoamine neurotransmitter

References 

Neurochemistry
Molecular neuroscience
Amino acids
Acidic amino acids
Neurotransmitters